The Lyon Street Bridge is a highway bridge that crosses the Willamette River in Albany, Oregon, United States. Built in 1973, the two-lane structure carries US 20 westbound traffic, with the adjacent Ellsworth Street Bridge carrying eastbound traffic. The bridge connects Albany with North Albany and is a major link between Albany and Corvallis.

See also
 
 
 
 List of crossings of the Willamette River

References

U.S. Route 20
Bridges in Linn County, Oregon
Bridges over the Willamette River
Bridges in Benton County, Oregon
Buildings and structures in Albany, Oregon
Road bridges in Oregon
Bridges of the United States Numbered Highway System
1973 establishments in Oregon
Truss bridges in the United States